The discography of Die Toten Hosen, a German punk band, consists of eighteen studio albums, six live albums, three compilation albums, four non-German albums and fifty-seven singles.

Since forming in 1982, Die Toten Hosen have become the most successful German punk band.

The band released their debut album, Opel-Gang, in 1983. While the album did not manage to break the charts, in 2006, it was certified Gold in Germany. One single, Reisefieber, was released to promote the album.

In 2008, Die Toten Hosen released their latest album In aller Stille. Debuting at number one on the German charts, it has sold over 300,000 copies and has been certified 3× Gold. Four singles were released from the album, "Strom", "Alles was war", "Auflösen" and "Ertrinken", all of which charted heavily in Germany.

Studio albums

Non-German albums

Live albums

Compilation albums

Singles

Video albums

References

Discographies of German artists
Rock music group discographies